Doing Time: Life Inside the Big House is a 1991 documentary film about the Lewisburg Federal Penitentiary, directed by Alan Raymond. It was nominated for an Academy Award for Best Documentary Feature. It was shown as part of HBO's America Undercover.

References

External links

Doing Time: Life Inside the Big House at Video Vérité

1991 films
American documentary films
Documentary films about incarceration in the United States
1991 documentary films
Films shot in Pennsylvania
1990s English-language films
1990s American films